Göncz is a Hungarian surname. Notable people with the surname include:

 Árpád Göncz (1922–2015), Hungarian liberal politician, former President of Hungary
 Kinga Göncz (born 1947), Hungarian academic, former Minister of Foreign Affairs of Hungary
 László Göncz (born 1960), Hungarian historian and politician
 Renáta Göncz (born 1991), Hungarian opera singer
 Zoltán Göncz (born 1958), Hungarian composer

Hungarian-language surnames